Nikolay Kolesnikov (born 1952) is a former Soviet weightlifter, Olympic champion and world champion. He won the gold medal in the featherweight class at the 1976 Summer Olympics in Montreal.

References

1952 births
Living people
Sportspeople from Tatarstan
Russian male weightlifters
Soviet male weightlifters
Weightlifters at the 1976 Summer Olympics
Olympic weightlifters of the Soviet Union
Olympic gold medalists for the Soviet Union
Olympic medalists in weightlifting
Medalists at the 1976 Summer Olympics